Madras Municipal Airport , formerly City-County Airport, is a public use airport located three nautical miles (6 km) northwest of the central business district of Madras, a city in Jefferson County, Oregon, United States. According to the FAA's National Plan of Integrated Airport Systems for 2009–2013, it is classified as a general aviation airport.

History

Originally known as Madras Army Air Field, this was a World War II Army Air Corps training base for B-17 Flying Fortress and Bell P-63 Kingcobras. In 2000, the airport began hosting the annual Airshow of the Cascades. The Erickson Aircraft Collection moved from the Tillamook Air Museum to the Madras Airport in 2014. In mid-2015 the airport's north hangar, which was built during World War II, was added to the National Register of Historic Places.

Facilities and aircraft 
It has two asphalt paved runways: 16/34 is 5,089 by 75 feet (1,551 x 23 m) and 4/22 is 2,701 by 50 feet (823 x 15 m).

For the 12-month period ending July 9, 2007, the airport had 10,735 aircraft operations, an average of 29 per day: 93% general aviation, 6% air taxi, and 1% military.
At that time there were 52 aircraft based at this airport: 94% single-engine, 2% multi-engine and 4% ultralight.

See also

 Oregon World War II Army Airfields

References

External links
 Airport/Industrial Park page at City of Madras website
 Madras Dragstrip - located on south end of airport
 Aerial photo as of 26 July 2000 from USGS The National Map
 
 

Airports in Jefferson County, Oregon
Airfields of the United States Army Air Forces Technical Service Command
Airfields of the United States Army Air Forces in Oregon
World War II airfields in the United States
Madras, Oregon